Theodor Eduard Burscher, also known as Theodor Konrad Burscher (1818 – 9 May 1877), was politician, who served as the high mayor of the city of Elbing, Kingdom of Prussia (now Elbląg, Poland) from 1853 to 1868, and the high mayor of the city of Stettin, Kingdom of Prussia (now Szczecin, Poland), from 1868 to 1877.

History 
Burscher was born in 1818, in Cottbus, Kingdom of Prussia (now part of Germany). He was the son Gottlieb Burscher and Caroline Burscher (née Selling), and was of Protestant faith. He was married to Ernestine Friederike Natalie Thusnelde Adelheid Burscher (née Belian). Together, they had daughter, Elise Caroline Laura Adelheid Burscher, who was born on 9 October 1856, in Trautzig, Kingdom of Prussia (now part of Olsztyn, Poland).

In 1853, he became the high mayor of the city of Elbing, Kingdom of Prussia (now Elbląg, Poland). His yearly salary was 2000 Reichsthaler. He remained in the office until 1868, when he resigned, to become the high mayor of the city of Stettin, Kingdom of Prussia (now Szczecin, Poland). He died in office, on 9 May 1877, around 10:30, in the Old Town Hall in Stettin.

Notes

References 

1818 births
1877 deaths
Politicians from Szczecin
Prussian politicians
Mayors of places in Germany
Mayors of places in Poland
People from Elbląg
People from Cottbus
Mayors of Szczecin